The Freedom and Socialism Party (ÖSP) is a Kurdish-based democratic socialist and federalist political party in Turkey. The party mentioned as Partiya Azadî û Sosyalîzmê in Kurdish.

Development
Communist Party of Kurdistan cadres including Sinan Çiftyürek and Mehmet Akyol announced the founding of a new frame for a legal party named Mesopotamia Socialist Party (Mezopotamya Sosyalist Partisi) after a November 2003 meeting in Gaziantep. The initiative for Mesopotamia Socialist Party merged with the Socialist Party Founders Committee, another faction of Kurdish socialists in October 2010. The new group was named the Freedom and Socialism Party and it was officially founded on 19 December 2011 with Çiftyürek as the chairman.

Ideology
Founder and chairman Sinan Çiftyürek describes the Freedom and Socialist Party as "a workers' party with a socialist line" and with no particular ethnic emphasis albeit its Kurdish background. The party propagates a federation of Turkish and Kurdish peoples "on a condition of equality".

References

2011 establishments in Turkey
Anti-imperialist organizations
Democratic socialist parties in Asia
Democratic socialist parties in Europe
Far-left politics in Turkey
Federalist parties
Kurdish political parties in Turkey
Marxist parties in Turkey
Political parties established in 2011
Political parties in Turkey
Socialist parties in Turkey